The Divisiones Regionales de Fútbol in the Basque Country are ultimately overseen by the Basque Football Federation which operates Group 4 of the Tercera División RFEF, the fifth tier of the Spanish football league system divided among each of the country's autonomous regions. However, unlike most of the regions, the leagues in the sixth tier and below are organised by three separate federations, corresponding to the provinces of Álava, Biscay and Gipuzkoa. The other region with this arrangement is the Canary Islands which has two provincial forks to its amateur setup, while Andalusia and the Balearic Islands have two and three parallel divisions respectively under the same umbrella.

League chronology
Timeline – Álava

Timeline – Gipuzkoa

Timeline – Biscay

Álava

División de Honor de Álava

The División de Honor de Álava or Arabako Ohorezko Maila is at the sixth level of Spanish football. All of the clubs are based in the province of Álava. The league consists of 18 teams. At the end of the season, the top club is promoted automatically to the Tercera División RFEF - Group 4. The teams finishing second play a promotion play-off depending on the number of vacancies in the Tercera División. Two clubs are relegated to Primera Regional.

2022–23 season teams

Regional Preferente de Álava 

The Regional Preferente is the seventh and lowest level of competition in Álava.

2022–23 season teams

Gipuzkoa

División de Honor de Guipúzcoa

The División de Honor de Guipúzcoa or Gipuzkoako Ohorezko Maila is at the sixth level of Spanish football. All of the clubs are based in the province of Gipuzkoa. The league consists of 18 teams. At the end of the season, the first team is promoted automatically to Tercera División RFEF - Group 4. The team finishing second plays a promotion play-off depending on the number of vacancies seats in the Tercera División. Four clubs are relegated to Regional Preferente.

2021–22 season teams

Preferente de Guipúzcoa

The Preferente is played in two groups of 16 teams. At the end of the season, the champions and the winner of the playoff between the runners-up are promoted to División de Honor. Three clubs in each group are relegated to Primera Regional.

Some teams playing in this level
CD Vasconia
Zumaiako FT
Zestoa KB

Primera Regional de Guipúzcoa

The Primera Regional is played with one group of 8 teams and four groups of 7. At the end of the season, the top four from each group advance to Fase de Ascenso while the other 16 teams play in Copa de Gipuzkoa. The Fase de Ascenso has two groups of 10 with the two winners and runners-up being promoted to Regional Preferente. The two 3rd placed finishers playoff to fill any vacancies.

Biscay

División de Honor de Vizcaya

The División de Honor de Vizcaya or Bizkaiko Ohorezko Maila is at the sixth level of Spanish football. All of the clubs are based in the province of Biscay. The league consists of 18 teams. At the end of the season, the top club is promoted automatically to the Tercera División - Group 4. The teams finishing second play a promotion play-off depending on the number of vacancies in the Tercera División. Two clubs are relegated to Territorial Preferente.

2021–22 season teams

Preferente de Vizcaya

The Preferente de Vizcaya is at the seventh level of Spanish football. All of the clubs are based in the province of Biscay. The league consists of 18 teams. At the end of the season, the top three clubs are promoted to División de Honor. Three clubs are relegated to the Primera División de Bizkaia.

Some teams playing in this level
Zalla UC
SD Retuerto Sport
Apurtuarte Club

Primera División de Bizkaia

The Primera División de Bizkaia is played in two groups of 18 teams. the champion and runner-up of both groups are promoted to Preferente de Bizkaia. The 3rd placed finishers play off to fill any vacancies. Two clubs in each group are relegated to the Segunda División de Bizkaia.

Segunda División de Bizkaia

The Segunda División de Bizkaia is played in two groups of 16. At the end of the season, the two champions and runners-up are promoted to the Primera División de Bizkaia. the 3rd placed teams playoff to fill any vacancies. three clubs in each group are relegated to Tercera División de Bizkaia.

Tercera División de Bizkaia

The Tercera División de Bizkaia is played with 46 teams in one group of 16 and two groups of 15. At the end of the season, the champions and runners-up are promoted. the 3rd placed teams advance to playoff league to fill any vacancies.

See also
Basque Football Federation
Biscay Championship
Gipuzkoa Championship

External links
Federación Vizcaina de Fútbol
Federación Guipuzcoana de Fútbol
Federación Alavesa de Fútbol

Divisiones Regionales de Fútbol
Basque football competitions